Pramila Giri is a Politician from Odisha. She was former Member of Legislative Assembly of Baisinga.

Early life
Pramila Giri was born in Baisinga, Mayurbhanj in a Hindu Gopal (Yadav) family.

References

1957 births
Living people
Odisha politicians
People from Mayurbhanj district
Biju Janata Dal politicians